The International Ski Federation (FIS) Alpine Ski World Cup was the premier circuit for alpine skiing competition. The inaugural season launched in January 1967, and the  season marked the 55th consecutive year for the FIS World Cup. As it had every year since 2006 (when the Sölden races were cancelled by a snowstorm), the season began in Sölden, Austria in October, and it ended with the World Cup finals in March, which were held in Lenzerheide, Switzerland. However, the COVID-19 pandemic forced many changes to the original racing schedule. Among them were the following:

Canceled events: Val d'Isere (AC); St. Anton (AC); Crans-Montana (AC); Levi (Men); Lech (Team); Lake Louise (3 DH, 2 SG); Alta Badia (P); Davos (P), Beaver Creek (DH, SG, GS); Chamonix (DH, P); Bansko (AC); Bormio (AC); Wengen (DH, SL, AC); Maribor (SL) and Åre (GS).

Ladies' calendar changes: Killington to Levi (SL); Killington to Courchevel (GS); Lake Louise to Val d'Isere (DH); Lake Louise to St. Moritz (SG); Åre to Maribor (GS); Maribor to Åre (SL) and Lake Louise to Crans-Montana (DH).

Men's calendar changes: Beaver Creek to Val d'Isere (GS, SG, DH); Val d'Isere to Alta Badia (SL): Garmisch to Adelboden (GS): Lake Louise to Wengen (DH); Lake Louise to Ga-Pa (SG) and Levi to Chamonix (SL). 

Additional events: Chamonix (SL); Bansko (GS); Bormio (SG), St. Anton (SG) and Val d'Isere (Ladies' SG).

Further changes due to the pandemic were considered likely and are shown on the schedule below. However, two result of these COVID-related changes were that (1) no Alpine combined events were held during the season, despite the increased emphasis placed on such events beginning with the prior season, and (2) no World Cup races were held in North America for the first time since the 1973-74 season and only the second time in World Cup history.

Men
The number of races in the World Cup history

after SL in Lenzerheide (21 March 2021)

Calendar

Rankings

Overall

Downhill

Super-G

Giant slalom

Slalom

Parallel (PG)

Ladies
The number of races in the World Cup history

after GS in Lenzerheide (21 March 2021)

Calendar

Rankings

Overall

Downhill

Super-G

Giant slalom

Slalom

Parallel (PG)

Alpine team event
World Cup history in real time

after PG in Lenzerheide (20 March 2021)

Calendar

* reserve skiers

Nations Cup

Overall

Men

Ladies

Prize money

Top-5 men

Top-5 ladies

Achievements 
First World Cup career victory 

Men
 Lucas Braathen (20), in his third season – Giant slalom in Sölden
 Martin Čater (27), in his ninth season – Downhill in Val-d'Isère
   Mauro Caviezel (32), in his twelfth season – Super-G in Val-d'Isère
 Ryan Cochran-Siegle (28), in his ninth season – Super-G in Bormio
 Manuel Feller (28), in his ninth season – Slalom in Flachau
 Sebastian Foss-Solevåg (29), in his ninth season – Slalom in Flachau

Women
   Michelle Gisin (27), in her ninth season – Slalom in Semmering
 Katharina Liensberger (23), in her sixth season – Slalom in Åre

First World Cup podium 

Men
 Lucas Braathen (20), in his third season – Giant slalom in Sölden – 1st place
 Martin Čater (27), in his ninth season – Downhill in Val-d'Isère – 1st place
 Matthieu Bailet (24), in his sixth season – Super-G in Saalbach-Hinterglemm – 2nd place
 Ryan Cochran-Siegle (28), in his ninth season – Downhill in Val Gardena – 2nd place
 Atle Lie McGrath (20), in his third season – Giant Slalom in Alta Badia – 2nd place
 Adrian Smiseth Sejersted (26), in his seventh season – Super-G in Val-d'Isère – 2nd place
   Gino Caviezel (28), in his tenth season – Giant Slalom in Sölden – 3rd place
   Justin Murisier (28), in his ninth season – Giant slalom in Alta Badia – 3rd place
   Sandro Simonet (25), in his fifth season – Slalom in Chamonix – 3rd place
 Christian Walder (29), in his fifth season – Super-G in Val-d'Isère – 3rd place
 Stefan Brennsteiner (29), in his ninth season – Giant Slalom in Bansko - 3rd place

Women
 Paula Moltzan (26), in her eighth season – Parallel-G in Lech/Zürs – 2nd place
 Kajsa Vickhoff Lie (22), in her fifth season – Super-G in Garmisch-Partenkirchen – 2nd place 
 Breezy Johnson (24), in her fifth season – Downhill in Val-d'Isère – 3rd place

Number of wins this season (in brackets are all-time wins) 

Men
 Alexis Pinturault – 5 (34)
 Vincent Kriechmayr – 3 (9)
   Marco Odermatt – 3 (4)
 Henrik Kristoffersen – 2 (23)
   Beat Feuz – 2 (15) 
 Clément Noël – 2 (8)
 Aleksander Aamodt Kilde – 2 (6)
 Marco Schwarz – 2 (4)
 Filip Zubčić – 2 (3)
 Manuel Feller – 2 (2)
 Dominik Paris – 1 (19) 
 Matthias Mayer – 1 (10)
   Ramon Zenhäusern – 1 (4)
 Mathieu Faivre – 1 (2)
 Linus Straßer – 1 (2)
 Lucas Braathen – 1 (1)
   Mauro Caviezel – 1 (1)
 Martin Čater – 1 (1)
 Ryan Cochran-Siegle – 1 (1)
 Sebastian Foss-Solevåg – 1 (1)

Women
   Lara Gut-Behrami – 6 (32)
 Petra Vlhová – 6 (20)
 Sofia Goggia – 4 (11)
 Marta Bassino – 4 (5)
 Mikaela Shiffrin – 3 (69)
 Katharina Liensberger – 2 (2) 
 Federica Brignone – 1 (16)
 Tessa Worley – 1 (14)
 Alice Robinson – 1 (3)
   Corinne Suter – 1 (3)
 Ester Ledecká – 1 (2)
   Michelle Gisin – 1 (1)

Retirements
The following athletes announced their retirements during or after the season:

Men
 Fabian Bacher
 Rémy Falgoux
 Valentin Giraud-Moine
   Marc Gisin
 Jean-Baptiste Grange
 Victor Guillot
 Ted Ligety
 Julien Lizeroux
 Bastian Meisen
 Jonathan Nordbotten
 Frederik Norys
 Hannes Reichelt
 Maxime Rizzo
 Giordano Ronci

Women
  Eva-Maria Brem
  Irene Curtoni
  Joséphine Forni
  Mireia Gutiérrez
  Lin Ivarsson
    Rahel Kopp
  Alice McKennis Duran
  Jennifer Piot
  Laurenne Ross
  Bernadette Schild
  Resi Stiegler
  Marina Wallner
  Michaela Wenig
  Emelie Wikström

Notes

References 

 
FIS Alpine Ski World Cup
World Cup
World Cup